Andria Zafirakou is British teacher and the winner of the 2018 Global Teacher Prize. She is an Arts and Textiles teacher at Alperton Community School in northwest London, England .

Career
Ms Zafirakou was born in north-west London to Greek-Cypriot parents and state-educated in Brent and Camden. She has worked her entire teaching career of 12 years at Alperton Community School and was promoted to Deputy Head of Art within a year of her arrival. She is now Associate Deputy Headteacher leading on staff professional development. She is married to a fitness instructor and has two daughters.

The school
Alperton Community School is a coeducational secondary school situated in the northwest of London with a student intake that reflects a variety of backgrounds. There are about 130 languages spoken in the London Borough of Brent and Ms Zafirakou has taught herself the basic phrases used by children in about 35 of them - including Hindi, Gujarati and Tamil - in an effort to build links with her pupils and their families. [1]

“By getting pupils to open up about their home lives, I discovered that many of my students come from crowded homes where multiple families share a single property.” Ms Zafirakou said.“It’s often so crowded and noisy I’ve had students tell me they have to do their homework in the bathroom, just to grab a few moments alone so they can concentrate.”“What is amazing is that whatever issues they are having at home, whatever is missing from their life or causing them pain, our school is theirs.” 

Zafirakou organised extra lessons during the day and the weekend, including giving pupils a quiet place to work.

Teaching philosophies
“(Teaching) it’s all about building relationships. Instead of worrying about teaching the curriculum or making sure that you’ve got a strict classroom environment, build your relationships first. Get your kids on board, connect with them, find out what it is that they’re interested in. Build the relationship, build that trust. And then everything else can happen.” When a child comes into a big frightening secondary school and the teacher greets them in their own language the child is won over, and the parents are won over too and will come into school when requested.

Ms Zafirakou started with art, seeing it as a language-free method of communication. She would introduce children to the art of their own culture before relating it to the white western art movements prescribed in the National Curriculum. She was aware about the levels of deprivation suffered by her pupils, with multiple families living in one house running a rota on when they may use the kitchen or bathroom. She created space for children to work after school and introduced classes on wellbeing and yoga. The curriculum was altered to make many subjects more applied rather than theoretical.

See also
 Hanan Al Hroub

References

External links
 Meet the winner of the Global Teacher Prize 2018; globalteacherprize.org

Year of birth missing (living people)
Living people
Artists from London
English women educators
People from the London Borough of Brent
Recipients of the Global Teacher Prize
Schoolteachers from London